Julia Renfro is the editor-in-chief of the English-language Aruba Today News Magazine and the photographer for the Dutch-based Bon Dia.

Renfro has become a source for American media on the Natalee Holloway case.

References
MSNBC The Abrams Report June 22, 2005
MSNBC Scarborough Country July 4, 2005
Fox News Bill O'Reilly Factor June 9, 2005
CNN "Was Race a Factor in Aruba Arrests?" June 15, 2005

External links
Aruba Today News Magazine
Bon Dia.

Aruban journalists
Year of birth missing (living people)
Living people